Claro (formerly CTE Telecom) is a mobile and fixed phone, broadband and television service provider in El Salvador.

Formerly controlled by parent company CTE Telecom in El Salvador (owned by América Móvil of Mexico), the company started its wireless service as "Personal" around 1999, and later added "ALÓ" with the motto "Facil y Rapido" (Spanish for "Easy and Fast "). In 2009, America Movil unified the brand in Latin America under the name Claro.

References

External links
Claro El Salvador
Services of Claro El Salvador

Mobile phone companies of El Salvador
San Salvador